George Voelk (born September 28, 1962) is a former Canadian football player who played with the Montreal Concordes as a defensive lineman. Voelk was drafted in the sixth round of the 1984 CFL Draft by the Concordes. Voelke attended the Montreal training camp in 1984, but did not make the team until his second attempt in 1985. Voelk dressed for all 16 games in 1985.

References 

Living people
1962 births
People from Tisdale, Saskatchewan
Players of Canadian football from Saskatchewan
Canadian football defensive linemen
Saskatchewan Huskies football players
Montreal Concordes players